The women's 78 kilograms (Half heavyweight) competition at the 2006 Asian Games in Doha was held on 2 December at the Qatar SC Indoor Hall.

Schedule
All times are Arabia Standard Time (UTC+03:00)

Results

Main bracket

Repechage

References
Results

External links
 
 Official website

W78
Judo at the Asian Games Women's Half Heavyweight
Asian W78